Brigadier Martin Hotine CMG CBE (17 June 1898 – 12 November 1968) was the head of the Trigonometrical and Levelling Division of the Ordnance Survey responsible for the 26-year-long retriangulation of Great Britain (1936–1962) and was the first Director General of the Directorate of Overseas Surveys (1946–1955).

He served on the North-West Frontier during the First World War and later in the Persian and Mesopotamian campaigns. He has been described as "decisive, ingenious and tough".

Cartography
Hotine was responsible for the design of the triangulation pillars constructed during the Geodetic resurvey of Britain. 6,173 of these were built. They provided a solid base for the theodolites used by the survey teams during the survey, thereby improving the accuracy of the readings obtained. They are sometimes referred to as "Hotine Pillars".

In the 1940s, Hotine developed a map projection for the Malay Peninsula and Borneo that is known as the Hotine oblique Mercator projection.

Personal life 
Hotine was married to Kate Amelia Hotine (née Pearson)(1895–1987) whose nickname to family and friends was 'Ajax'.

Honours
1947 Royal Geographical Society Founder's Medal "For research work in Air Survey ... and for his cartographic work."
1955 Photogrammetric Society's first President's Medal
1964 The Institution of Royal Engineers' Gold Medal

Publications

References

1898 births
1968 deaths
Royal Engineers officers
British Army personnel of World War II
British Army personnel of World War I
English surveyors
People educated at Southend High School for Boys
Companions of the Order of St Michael and St George
Commanders of the Order of the British Empire